Danté Jean Craig Bartolomeo (born 1969) is an American politician. Bartolomeo, a Democrat, began her political career as a member of the Meriden City Council from 2008 to 2012. She then held the Connecticut Senate seat for the 13th district from 2013 to 2017. In January 2019, she was appointed deputy commissioner of the Connecticut Department of Labor. Bartolomeo's promotion to commissioner took effect in July 2021, and she was formally confirmed to the position in February 2022.

Early life and education
Bartolomeo's father Craig Self was a Republican who served as town chairman of Wallingford, Connecticut. Bartolomeo attributed her political positioning as a fiscal moderate to his influence, and her mother, Barbara Calza Self, for her views on social liberalism. Bartolomeo has a sister, Elizabeth Mercedes Craig Self. Bartolomeo is a 1987 graduate of Mercy High School in Middletown and earned her bachelor of arts degree in psychology from Colby College in 1991 with a cum laude distinction. She and her husband Doug Bartolomeo, a retired police officer, have two children.

Political career
Bartolomeo was a member of the Meriden City Council from July 2008 to December 2012. She succeeded Michael Rohde as representative of Area 2, after Rohde had been elected mayor. During her first state legislative campaign against incumbent state representative Len Suzio in 2012, Bartolomeo claimed that his supporters were using push polls to gain an advantage. Suzio's win in a 2011 special election was considered a "fluke", due in part to the fact that Suzio's predecessor Thomas Gaffey had violated electoral law. Bartolomeo defeated Suzio, and took office as a Democratic legislator representing the thirteenth district of the Connecticut Senate. She faced Suzio for a second time in 2014, and won reelection. Bartolomeo's 2016 campaign was unsuccessful, and Suzio, backed by the Connecticut Business and Industry Association, returned to office. In January 2019, Ned Lamont appointed Bartolomeo deputy commissioner of the Connecticut Department of Labor. After Kurt Westby announced his intention to retire, Lamont promoted Bartolomeo in June 2021. The Connecticut Senate confirmed Bartolomeo to the position in February 2022.

References

Connecticut city council members
Living people
Politicians from Meriden, Connecticut
People from Wallingford, Connecticut
1969 births
Women state legislators in Connecticut
21st-century American women politicians
21st-century American politicians
Women city councillors in Connecticut
Democratic Party Connecticut state senators
Colby College alumni
State labor commissioners in the United States